Verve was a modernist Parisian art magazine published by Teriade between 1937 and 1960. The magazine was first published in December 1937 with a cover featuring artwork by Henri Matisse. The headquarters of the magazine was in Paris. It published 38 issues in 10 volumes including lithographs by the most prominent artists of the Parisian art scene of the first half of the 20th century. In addition, the early contributors included James Joyce and Ernest Hemingway. The magazine folded in 1960.

References

Bibliography
Hans Bolliger, Tériade Éditeur-Revue Verve. Klipstein & Kornfeld, 1960
Hommage à Tériade, Grand Palais, 16 mai - 3 septembre 1973, textes de Michel Anthonioz, Paris, Grand Palais, Centre National d’Art Contemporain, 1973, 68 p. : ill. ; . 
Chara Kolokytha, 'The Art Press and Visual Culture in Paris during the Great Depression: Cahiers d'Art, Minotaure and Verve' in: Visual Resources, An International Journal of Documentation 3, vol. 29 September 2013, pp. 184–215.
Chara Kolokytha, ‘L’amour de l’art en France est toujours aussi fécond : La Maison d’Editions Verve et la reproduction de manuscrits à peintures conservés dans les Bibliothèques de France pendant les années noires (1939-1944)’, French Cultural Studies 2, vol.25, May 2014, pp. 121–139.

External links
Tériade Museum
 Teriade Project

1937 establishments in France
1960 disestablishments in France
Defunct literary magazines published in France
French-language magazines
Magazines established in 1937
Magazines disestablished in 1960
Magazines published in Paris
French art publications